This is a list of haplogroups of historic people. Haplogroups can be determined from the remains of historical figures, or derived from genealogical DNA tests of people who trace their direct maternal or paternal ancestry to a noted historical figure. Some contemporary notable figures have made their test results public in the course of news programs or documentaries about this topic; they may be included in this list too.

MtDNA results indicate direct maternal descent while Y-DNA results indicate direct paternal descent; these are only two of many lines of descent. Scientists make inferences of descent as hypotheses which could be disproved or modified by future research.

Ancient samples 

These are results from 'ancient' samples, those collected from the remains or reputed remains of the person. Because mtDNA breaks down more slowly than nuclear DNA, it is often possible to obtain mtDNA results where other testing fails.

Birger Magnusson 

Birger Jarl, the founder of Stockholm, the modern capital of Sweden, belonged to Y Haplogroup I-M253, according to Andreas Carlsson at the National Board of Forensic Medicine of Sweden. Birger Magnusson was the ancestor of a line of kings of both Sweden and Norway, starting with his son, Valdemar, King of Sweden.

Gaodang King Korguz (高唐王=趙王 闊裏吉思) 

Noble burials of Mongols in the Yuan dynasty in Shuzhuanglou Site (northernmost Hebei, China, 700YBP) were excavated. All three men excavated belong to Y haplogroup Q, with subclade not analysed.

The most principal occupant, Gaodang King Korguz, had mtDNA of haplogroup D4m2. Two others' mtDNA are A

Korguz was the son of a princess of Kublai Khan and he was the king of the Ongud and a descendant of Gok-Turk. The Ongud claimed descent from the Shatuo, prominent in the era of the Five Dynasties and Ten Kingdoms period. His two wives were all princesses of Yuan Dynasty. It was very important for the Yuan dynasty to maintain marriage-alliance with the Onguds, which had been very important assistant since Genghis Khan. About 16 princesses of Yuan dynasty were married to khans of the Ongud.

Jean-Paul Marat 

In 2020, a genetic study showed that the figure of the French Revolution Jean-Paul Marat killed in 1793, had the haplogroup H2 (mtDNA).

Luke the Evangelist 

Luke the Evangelist is a Christian saint and apostle born on 1st century A.D. in Roman Syria and died in Roman Greece. Remains reputed to have been his had haplogroup H2 (mtDNA).

Louis XVII 

Louis XVII was the younger son of King of France Louis XVI and Queen Marie Antoinette. His maternal haplogroup is H.

Queen Marie Antoinette  

The maternal haplogroup of Marie Antoinette is H.

Mary Magdalene 

A lock of hair kept at a reliquary at Saint-Maximin-la-Sainte-Baume basilica, France, which local tradition holds belonged to the biblical figure Mary Magdalene, was allegedly assigned to mitochondrial haplogroup K. Ancient DNA sequencing of a capillary bulb bore the K1a1b1a subclade according to the author Gérard Lucotte, who concluded that she was likely of Pharisian maternal origin. Gérard Lucotte, the controversial geneticist in charge of analyzing the hair material, also publicly claimed in France in 2005 to have "discovered" the DNA of Jesus Christ from the Argenteuil Tunic relic.

Mummy Juanita 

The mummy "Juanita" of Peru, also called the "Ice Maiden", has been shown to belong to mitochondrial haplogroup A.

Nicholas II of Russia and family

The last tsar of Russia, Nicholas II of Russia, was assigned to mtDNA haplogroup T, based on mutations 16126C, 16169Y, 16294T, 16296T, 73G, 263G, and 315.1C. His results matched those of a cousin, Prince Nikolai Trubetskoy, but showed a heteroplasmy – a mix of two different sequences – indicating a recent mutation. To further confirm the identity, the tsar's brother, Grand Duke George, was exhumed and found to have the same mitochondrial heteroplasmy.

Empress Alexandra of Russia and her children, Olga, Tatiana, Maria, Anastasia, and Alexei were identified as belonging to mtDNA haplogroup H (16111T, 16357C, 263G, 315.1C). This identity was confirmed by match to that of her grand-nephew, Prince Philip, Duke of Edinburgh.

As part of the same analysis, mitochondrial types were determined for four further individuals, thought to have been the Royal Physician and servants.

Nicholas II has been predicted as having a Y-DNA R1b haplotype.

Oseberg ship remains 

The remains of the younger of the two women buried with the Oseberg Ship were tested and discovered to have mtDNA of U7.

Petrarch 

The purported remains of Francesco Petrarca, known as Petrarch, were tested for DNA in 2003. Another analysis revealed that purported skull of Petrarca belonged to a woman, the DNA from rib belonged to mtDNA haplogroup J2.

Ramesses III 

In December 2012, a genetic study conducted by the same researchers who decoded King Tutankhamun's DNA predicted using an STR-predictor that Ramesses III, second pharaoh of the Twentieth Dynasty of Egypt and considered to be the last great New Kingdom regent to wield any substantial authority over Egypt, belonged to Y-DNA haplogroup E-M2, alternatively known as haplogroup E1b1a.

Richard III of England 

Richard III's mitochondrial haplotype was inferred from living descendants and then the identity of his remains confirmed through a multidisciplinary process including genetic analysis of both his mitochondrial and Y-DNA. In 2004 British historian John Ashdown-Hill traced a British-born woman living in Canada, Joy Ibsen (née Brown), who is a direct maternal line descendant of Anne of York, Duchess of Exeter, a sister of Richard III of England. Joy Ibsen's mtDNA was tested and belongs to mtDNA haplogroup J. Joy Ibsen died in 2008. On 4 February 2013, University of Leicester researchers announced that there was an mtDNA match between that of a skeleton exhumed in Leicester suspected of belonging to Richard III and that of Joy Ibsen's son, Michael Ibsen, and a second direct maternal line descendant named Wendy Duldig. They share mtDNA haplogroup J1c2c.

The Y haplogroup of Richard III, last king of the House of York and last of the House of Plantagenet, was identified as Y-DNA G-P287, in contrast to the Y haplotypes of the putative modern relatives.

Sweyn II of Denmark 

In order to verify whether the body of a woman entombed near Sweyn II of Denmark in Roskilde Cathedral is that of his mother Estrid, mtDNA from pulp of teeth from each of the two bodies was extracted and analysed. The king was assigned to mtDNA haplogroup H and the woman was assigned to mtDNA haplogroup H5a. Based on the observation of two HVR1 sequence differences, it was concluded that it is highly unlikely that the woman was the king's mother.

Yuya

Yuya was Tutankhamun's great grandfather. Predicted Y-DNA haplogroup G2a, based on ancient Y-STR profiles. Yuya served as a key adviser for Amenhotep III, and held posts such as "King’s Lieutenant" and "Master of the Horse"; his title "Father-of-the-god" possibly referred specifically to his being Amenhotep's father-in-law. In his native town of Akhmin, Yuya was a prophet of Min, the chief "god" of the area, and served as this deity's "Superintendent of Cattle".

Tutankhamun 

There is controversy regarding Tutankhamun's Y-DNA profile. It was not discussed in a 2010 academic study that included DNA profiling of some of the male mummies of the Eighteenth Dynasty of Egypt, and was published in the Journal of the American Medical Association.

The team that analysed the Eighteenth Dynasty mummies disputed a claim later made by the personal genomics company iGENEA regarding Tutankhamun's Y-DNA profile. Staff from iGENEA examined images from news coverage of the above study, that purportedly showed data from Tutankhamun's Y-DNA profile. Based on the unverified images, iGENEA claimed that Tutankhamun belonged to Y-DNA haplogroup R1b1a2, a claim that was rejected as "unscientific" by members of the team that had actually analysed the Eighteenth Dynasty mummies. The original researchers also stated they had not been consulted by iGENEA before it published the haplogroup information.

Gleb Svyatoslavich 

The genetic study "Population genomics of the Viking world" was published September 16, 2020 in Nature, and showed that Gleb Svyatoslavich (sample VK542), an 11th century Rurikid Prince of Tmutarakan and Novgorod in Kievan Rus', was found to belong to Y-DNA haplogroup I2a1a2b1a1a (I-Y3120) and mtDNA haplogroup H5a2a. In YFull's YTree a more detailed position is given for his Y-DNA under I-Y3120's subclades Y4460 > Y3106 > Y91535.

Deduction by testing of descendants or other relatives

Because mtDNA is carried through the direct female line, some researchers have identified the haplotype of historic persons by testing descendants in their direct female line. In the case of males, their mother's direct female lineage descendants are tested. Y-DNA testing may be carried out on male relatives.

Bure kinship from Sweden 

The male lineage of the medieval Bure kinship from Sweden has been identified as Y-DNA haplogroup G2a, based on several BigY tests carried out in 2014 on people living today. Descendants of two of the sons of Old Olof (who was born about 1380) were identified as G-Y12970*, and descendants of his alleged brother Fale as G-Y16788. The test result supports genealogical information recorded in about 1610 by Johannes Bureus. The DNA results also disproved a branch that was later added to the family book.

Cao Cao, the Cao Wei State of Ancient China 

Chinese warlord Cao Cao, who was posthumously titled Emperor Wu of the state of Cao Wei, belonged to Y-DNA Haplotype O2-M268 according to DNA tests of some documented present-day descendants with lineage records. Ancient DNA analysis of the tooth of Cao Cao's granduncle, Cao Ding, showed that Cao Cao belonged to Y-DNA haplogroup O-M175. A followup publication precisely identified the haplogroup more precisely as a subgroup of O-M175, designated O1b1-F1462(xPK4).

Charles Darwin 

Charles Darwin belonged to Y haplogroup R1b based on a sample from his great-great-grandson.

Edward IV of England 

Edward IV of England and his brother Richard III of England, both sons of Cecily Neville, Duchess of York, would have shared the same mtDNA haplogroup J1c2c.

Albert Einstein 

Albert Einstein is alleged to belong to Y Haplogroup E. Tested Einsteins from Germany belong to E1b1b1b2* (cluster SNP PF1952, formerly known as the E-Z830-B or "Jewish cluster"). A patrilineal descendant of Naphtali Hirsch Einstein (1733–1799), Albert Einstein's great-grandfather, was tested and belonged to E-M35 (E1b1b1).

Fath Ali Shah Qajar 

Fath-Ali Shah Qajar (1772–1834), the second emperor and shah of the Qajar dynasty of Iran belonged to Haplogroup J-M267 with DYS388 = 13 as deduced from testing of descendants of several of his sons.

Benjamin Franklin 

Doras Folger, one of Benjamin Franklin's mother Abiah Lee Folger's six sisters, passed on her mtDNA to her 9th-great-granddaughter, Charlene Chambers King, indicating that Franklin belonged to mitochondrial haplogroup V, with the following mutations: T16298C, 315.1C, 309.1C, A263G, and T72C.

Genghis Khan 

There are no living males known to descend directly from Genghis Khan, or any of his nearest male relatives. Several scientists have created their own theories about the Y-chromosomal haplogroup (and therefore the patrilineal ancestry) of Genghis Khan. The proposed candidates include haplogroup C3, haplogroup Q, haplogroup R1b and haplogroup C2.

Y chromosome haplogroup C2c1a1a1-M407 is carried by Mongol descendants of the Northern Yuan ruler from 1474–1517, Dayan Khan, who is a male line descendant of Genghis Khan which was found out after geneticists in Mongolia conducted tests on them. This is a different haplogroup from the infamous widespread C2b1a3a1c2-F5481 clade of C2*-ST which is widespread in Central Asia among Kazakhs, Hazaras and ordinary commoner Mongols since Kazakhs and Hazaras were descended from ordinary Mongol soldiers during the Mongol empire conquests but not from Genghis himself. The Kerey clan of the Kazakhs have a high amount of the C3* star-cluster (C2*-ST) Y chromosome and is very high among Hazaras, Kazakhs and Mongols in general.

Toghan, Genghis Khan's sixth son has claimed descendants who have Y haplogroup C2b1a1b1-F1756 just like the first son of Genesis Khan, Jochi's descendants in the Kazakh Tore clan.

Numerous studies by teams of biochemists led by M. V. Derenko (2007), based on the Y-DNA of people who claim to be modern descendants of Genghis Khan, have indicated that Genghis Khan may have belonged to a subclade of Haplogroup C-M217 (C2) such as C-F4002 (C2b1a3).

However, research published in 2016 analyzed DNA from a Borjigin burial site in Mongolia, and suggested that Genghis Khan may have belonged to the West Eurasian haplogroup R-M343 (R1b) instead of haplogroup C. The remains of the burials were described as having an East Asian appearance, which the authors attributed to their East Eurasian mitochondrial DNA haplogroups. 

A 2019 study proposed that the Y lineage of Jochi (Genghis Khan's eldest son) may have been haplogroup C2b1a1b1 (C2), which they identify as a new potential candidate for Genghis Khan's true Y-DNA lineage.

Gia Long 

Gia Long, who was the first emperor of the Nguyễn dynasty of Vietnam founded by the Nguyễn-Phuoc family may have belonged to Y-DNA haplogroup O-M95 according to the DNA tests of one documented descendant (if paternity matches genealogy). Given the sample size, however, this result cannot be regarded as conclusive and further testing of other documented descendants is necessary to help confirm or refute this finding.

Adolf Hitler 

In 2010, journalist Jean-Paul Mulders and historian Marc Vermeeren publicised analysis of samples taken from 39 patrilineal relatives of Adolf Hitler which revealed that Hitler belonged to Y-DNA Haplogroup E-M215 (E1b1b) a haplogroup that is most commonly found in the Horn of Africa.

Jean-Paul Mulders and Marc Vermeeren then pointed out that this haplogroup is common among Afroasiatic speakers. Mulders contradicted interpretations of his research by some media outlets, which claimed that Hitler definitely had Jewish ancestry. Mulders commented:

The accuracy of some of the coverage arising from this study was questioned. Professor Michael Hammer of Family Tree DNA said that "scientific studies as well as records from our own database[,] make it clear that one cannot reach the kind of conclusion featured in the published articles." Citing Family Tree DNA's own data that shows that more than 9% of the German and Austrian population belong to E-M35, and that about 80% of these are not Jewish, Hammer concluded, "[t]his data clearly shows that just because one person belongs to the branch of the Y-chromosome referred to as haplogroup E1b1b, that does not mean the person is likely to be of Jewish ancestry."

In 2019, Leonard Sax published an article titled "Aus den Gemeinden von Burgenland: Revisiting the question of Adolf Hitler’s paternal grandfather". In this article, Sax states that the methods by which the DNA samples were taken from Hitler's relatives in this study would be disqualified from a reputable journal. Sax commented:

Thomas Jefferson 

Direct male-line descendants of a cousin of United States president Thomas Jefferson were DNA tested to investigate historical assertions that Jefferson fathered children with his slave Sally Hemings.

An extended 17-marker haplotype was published in 2007, and the company Family Tree DNA has also published results for other markers in its standard first 12-marker panel. Combining these sources gives the consolidated 21-marker haplotype below. The Jeffersons belong to Haplogroup T (M184) (formerly known as K2).

Louis XVI

Analysis of a handkerchief with blood traces said to have been obtained at the execution of Louis XVI of France, suggested that he may have belonged to Y-DNA haplogroup G-M201. However, testing on some of his supposed relatives show he might have belonged to haplogroup R-U106 (a subclade of R1b).

Martin Luther 

Tested relatives of Protestant reformer Martin Luther belonged to Haplogroup I2a-Din-N (L147.2+).

Napoleon 

Analysis of two beard hairs revealed that Napoleon Bonaparte belonged to Y haplogroup E1b1b1c1* (E-M34*).

Niall of the Nine Hostages 

A study conducted at Trinity College, Dublin, found that a striking percentage of men in Ireland (and quite a few in Scotland) share the same Y chromosome. Niall established a royal dynasty which dominated the island for six centuries. Niall belongs to Haplogroup R1b1c7 (M222). Dr. Moore's results examined some different parts of DNA (loci) from the result given here. More recently, however, it has been determined that the emergence of R-M222 predates Niall and may be more than 2,000 years old. Therefore, not all men who belong to this haplogroup are descendants of Niall. A history of the lineage of Irish kings that was compiled by Irish monks, known as "the Annals of the Four Masters" lists "Conn of the Hundred Battles" among the ancestors of Niall. So, it may be that the haplogroup previously attributed to Niall is actually attributable to Conn of the Hundred Battles.

Brian Boru  

The Irish King Brian Boru, founder of the O'Brien Dynasty is associated with the Dalcassian haplogroup R1B-L226.

Nurhaci 

Y Haplogroup C3b2b1* (C-M401*, (xF5483) has been identified as a possible marker of the Aisin Gioro (who were founders of the Qing dynasty) and is found in ten different ethnic minorities in northern China, but completely absent from Han Chinese.

Emperor Higashiyama

Emperor Higashiyama (1675-1710) belonged to Y-DNA haplogroup D1a2a1a2 (D-IMS-JST055457/CTS107), which is a subclade of haplogroup D1a2a which is prominent among the Jōmon people that make up about 30% of modern Japanese ancestry. This was determined with a test on an oral mucosa sample taken from his paternal descendants.

Minamoto no Yoritomo

Minamoto no Yoritomo (1147–1199), the first shōgun of the Kamakura shogunate, and a descendant of Emperor Seiwa (858–876), the 56th Emperor of Japan. He, the Minamonto (Genji) clan and patrilineal descendants of the Imperial family of Japan should belong to the same Y-DNA haplogroup D1a2a1a2b1a1 (D-Z1504, CTS8093).

Somerled 

In 2003 Oxford University researchers traced the Y-chromosome signature of Somerled of Argyll, one of Scotland's greatest warriors, who is credited with driving out the Vikings. He was also paternal grandfather of the founder of Clan Donald. Through clan genealogies, the genetic relation was mapped out. Somerled belongs to haplogroup R1a1.

In 2005 a study by Professor of Human Genetics Bryan Sykes of Oxford University led to the conclusion that Somerled has possibly 500,000 living descendants. Sykes deduced that despite Somerled's reputation for having driven out the Vikings from Scotland, Somerled's own Y-DNA closely matched that of the Vikings he fought.

Emanuel Swedenborg 
Emanuel Swedenborg (1688–1772), the 18th century scientist and mystic from Sweden likely belonged to the haplogroup I1-BY229, a haplogroup with a common ancestor about 1500 years ago who lived somewhere in central Scandinavia.

Nikola Tesla 

The testing of actual relatives’ Serb scientist and inventor Nikola Tesla (1856-1943), published on the Serbian DNA Project at Poreklo, showed that his Y-DNA line was R1a-M458 (L1029 subclade).

Rothschild Family 

Men of the Jewish Rothschild family, who established an international banking business, acquired the largest fortune in modern world history and established a true dynasty in the 19th century, apparently belong to haplogroup J2a1-L210.

Haplogroup J2 is commonly found within Asia Minor, Persia, Central Asia and the Caucasus Mountains and is frequent in modern and historical inhabitants of the Levant and Fertile Crescent especially among Jews and in Lebanon. Subclade J2a is very common amongst Ingush, and has been found in West Eurasian corpses discovered in the Altai mountains.

Queen Victoria 

mtDNA Haplogroup H (16111T, 16357C, 263G, 315.1C):
Empress Alexandra of Russia's identity was confirmed by matching her mtDNA with that of her grand-nephew, Prince Philip, Duke of Edinburgh. Their common maternal ancestor, Princess Alice of the United Kingdom, and her mother, Queen Victoria, must therefore have shared this haplotype. Genealogies show that Charles II of England had the same matrilineal ancestress as Queen Victoria, namely Anne of Bohemia and Hungary. Catherine the Great is 11-knee relation of Queen Victoria on this lineage.

Alexander Hamilton 

He is one of the Founding Fathers of the United States. His Y-DNA Haplogroup was I1a.

John Adams 

He was the first Vice President and second President of the U.S. His Y-DNA Haplogroup was R1b1.

John Quincy Adams 

He was the sixth President of the U.S. His Y-DNA Haplogroup was R1b1.

See also

 Ancient DNA
 Genealogical DNA testing
 Paleogenetics

References

External links
 Evidence of the Past: A Map and Status of U.S. Ancient Remains
 Royal DNA of Europe
 List of ancient DNA
 List of haplogroups of famous Japanese people
 

DNA
Genetic genealogy
Haplogroups